The 127th General Assembly comprised the state legislature of the U.S. state of Ohio. The House of Representatives is the lower house of the Ohio General Assembly. Every two years, all of the house seats come up for election. The 127th General Assembly was in session in 2007 and 2008. The party distribution was 53 Republicans and 46 Democrats.

Make-up of Ohio House of Representatives for the 127th General Assembly 
Results of the November 7, 2006 Election:

Leadership

Majority Leadership

Minority Leadership

Members of the Ohio House of Representatives

App- Member was appointed to current House Seat

127th General Assembly
House 127